Faverolles is a commune in the Eure-et-Loir department in northern France. The Faverolles chicken breed is named after it.

André Hornez, lyricist of C'est si bon, Qu'est-ce qu'on attend pour être heureux ?, Ça vaut mieux que d'attraper la scarlatine, Tiens, tiens, tiens, Avec son tralala, Je suis swing, lived in Mesnil-Condit until his death in 1989 and is buried there.

Population

See also
Communes of the Eure-et-Loir department

References

Communes of Eure-et-Loir